The Season seven 2022 Hawthorn Football Club season is the club's 1st season in the AFL Women's, the 1st season playing home games at the Box Hill City Oval, the 1st season playing home games at Frankston Park, Bec Goddard was appointed as the 1st coach of Hawthorn, and Tilly Lucas-Rodd was appointed the 1st captain.

Club summary 
The 2023 AFL Women's season will be the 8th season of the AFL Women's competition since its inception in 2017; having entered the competition in 2022, it is the 2nd season contested by the Hawthorn Football Club. KFC, and Nature Valley are the clubs two major partners.

Playing list changes

Trades

Priority signing period

Retirements and delistings

Draft

2023 player squad

References 

Hawthorn Football Club seasons